Landtag elections in the People's State of Hesse (Volksstaat Hessen) during the Weimar Republic were held at irregular intervals between 1919 and 1932. Results with regard to the total vote, the percentage of the vote won and the number of seats allocated to each party are presented in the tables below. On 31 March 1933, the sitting Landtag was dissolved by the Nazi-controlled central government and reconstituted to reflect the distribution of seats in the national Reichstag. The Landtag subsequently was formally abolished as a result of the "Law on the Reconstruction of the Reich" of 30 January 1934 which replaced the German federal system with a unitary state.

1919
The 1919 Hessian state election was held on 26 January 1919 to elect the 70 members of the Hessian constituent people's assembly.

1921
The 1921 Hessian state election was held on 27 November 1921 to elect the 70 members of the Hessian Landtag.

1924
The 1924 Hessian state election was held on 7 December 1924 to elect the 70 members of the Hessian Landtag.

1927
The 1927 Hessian state election was held on 13 November 1927 to elect the 70 members of the Hessian Landtag.

1931
The 1931 Hessian state election was held on 15 November 1931 to elect the 70 members of the Hessian Landtag.

1932
The 1932 Hessian state election was held on 19 June 1932 to elect the 70 members of the Hessian Landtag.

References

Elections in the Weimar Republic
Elections in Hesse
Hesse
Hesse
Hesse
Hesse
Hesse
Hesse